This list includes all the 83 players born outside the Netherlands who played at least one match for the Oranje. Most of this players were born in Indonesia while it was part of the Dutch East Indies and in Suriname. There are also naturalized players like Jonathan De Guzmán or immigrants like Ola and Collins John.

Born in the Dutch East Indies

Indonesia 

 Law Adam 1930–1933
 Jan Akkersdĳk 1908
 Beb Bakhuys 1928–1937
 Hans Blume 1907
 Leo Bosschart 1909–1920
 Nico Bouvy 1912–1913
 Frans De Brujin Kops 1906–1908
 Eddy De Neve 1905–1906
 Guus De Seriere 1911–1912
 Jo Eshuijs 1906
 Jacques Francken 1914
 Mannes Francken 1906–1914
 Just Göbel 1911–1919
 Vic Gonsalves 1909–1910
 Jur Haak 1912–1913
 Karel Heijting 1907–1910
 Max Henny 1907
 Dé Kessler 1909–1922
 Dolf Kessler 1905–1906
 Jan Kok 1908
 Therus Küchlin 1925–1926
 Harry Kuneman 1908
 Lo La Chapelle 1907
 Anton Lens 1906
 Dick MacNeill 1920
 Miel Mundt 1909
 Herman Peltzer 1909
 Marius Sandberg 1926
 Edu Snethlage 1907–1909
 Dick Snoek 1950–1951
 Albert Snouck Hurgronje 1924–1925
 Eetje Sol 1908–1909
 Cees Ten Cate 1912
 Piet Valkenburg 1912
 Jan Van Breda Kolff 1911–1913
 Dolf Van Der Nagel 1914
 Fred Van Der Poel 1923
 Lothar Van Gogh 1907
 Guus Van Hecking Colenbrander 1908
 Hans Van Kesteren 1929
 Miel Van Leijden 1910
 Oscar Van Rappard 1920
 Ben Verweij 1919–1924
 Rens Vis 1926
 Henk Wamsteker 1925–1929
 David Wijnveldt 1912–1914

Born in Suriname

Born while part of the Kingdom of the Netherlands 

 Regi Blinker 1993–1994
Edgar Davids 1994–2005
 Jerry De Jong 1990–1991
 Henk Fraser 1989–1992
 Jimmy Floyd Hasselbaink 1998–2002
 Henny Meijer 1987
 Stanley Menzo 1989–1992
 Humphrey Mijnals 1960
 Ulrich Van Gobbel 1993–1994
 John Veldman 1996
 Marciano Vink 1991
 Aron Winter 1987–2000
 Romeo Zondervan 1981

Born after the 1975 Independence 
 Edson Braafheid 2009–2011
 Romeo Castelen 2004–2007
 Clarence Seedorf 1994–2008
 Andwelé Slory 2007
 Dwight Tiendalli 2013
 Owen Wijndal 2020–

Born in Curaçao

Netherlands Antilles 
 Javier Martina
 Vurnon Anita 2010

Born in other countries

Australia 

 Graeme Rutjes 1989–1991

Belgium 

 Toon Brusselers 1955–1962
 Youri Mulder 1994–2001

Canada 

 John Van't Schip 1986–1995

 Jonathan De Guzmán 2013–2015

Germany 

 Willi Lippens 1971

Ghana 

 George Boateng 2001–2006
 Riga Mustapha

Liberia 

 Collins John 2004
 Ola John 2013

Malaysia 

 Joop Boutmy 1912–1914

Morocco 

 Adam Maher 2012–2013

Nigeria 

 Arnaut Danjuma 2018–

Portugal 

 Bruno Martins Indi 2012–

Switzerland 

 Luuk De Jong 2011–
 Siem De Jong 2010–2013
 Terence Kongolo 2014–

Zambia 

 Guus Til 2018–

List by country of birth

References 

Netherlands
Association football player non-biographical articles
Born outside